The HKL Class M100 is the first and oldest class of metro trains in use on the Helsinki Metro. One train consists of two individually numbered cars. A total of 42 car pairs (84 cars in total) were manufactured between 1977 and 1984.

Up to six pairs can be combined into a 12-car train formation, however due to the relatively short length of the platforms (especially on the new Länsimetro extension), at most only two pairs (giving a 4-car formation per train; and prior to the Länsimetro opening in 2017 three pairs resulting in 6-car formations could also be seen during rush hour) can be combined for passenger service. Longer combinations are used in maintenance operations. Any Helsinki metro train types can be combined mechanically, such as for towing. The M100 series is the first train type in the world to use VVVF propulsion inverters, developed and manufactured by Strömberg.

The first three units (cars 101–106) were constructed as prototypes in 1977 and had some minor technical differences compared to the later units. The prototype units were retired from service in 2021 and five of them were subsequently scrapped in Vantaa, with one unit preserved at Helsinki City Museum.

The M100 trains underwent its first round of refurbishment in 2004–2009, at the Talgo Oy (now Škoda Transtech) rolling stock works at Otanmäki. In 2017, the City Council of Helsinki decided to refurbish class M100, class M200 and  class M300 trains in order to extend their lifetime for another 10 years. The renovation will start in late 2019 and will be completed by government-owned VR FleetCare. It is planned to delay acquiring new metro trains for the potential automation of the metro system, due to the decision to cancel the contract to automate the Helsinki Metro in 2015. The prototype trains (101–106) will not be renovated.


Accidents and incidents 
 On 27 July 2016, M100 carriage no. 157 was involved in an accident with M300 unit no. 302 when the latter derailed near Itäkeskus metro station during testing.

See also 

 Helsinki Metro
 Helsinki City Transport
 HKL Class M200
 HKL Class M300

References

External links 
 

Helsinki Metro
Multiple units of Finland
Valmet